God Colony are a London-based industrial hip-hop music-producing duo. Their music has featured fellow Soundcloud stars Flohio, BbyMutha, Stash Marina and Kojey Radical.

Early career 
God Colony produced music together in Merseyside, England as teenagers, since moving to London, England. In 2015 they began working on a debut mix-tape with artists including Flohio.

Releases 
God Colony releases have been self-published and released on sites like BandCamp.

References

External links 
 Bandcamp page - https://godcolony.bandcamp.com
 Facebook page - https://www.facebook.com/godcolony/
 Twitter page - https://twitter.com/god_colony

Hip hop duos